The siege of Diu occurred when an army of the Sultanate of Gujarat under Khadjar Safar, aided by forces of the Ottoman Empire, attempted to capture the city of Diu in 1538, then held by the Portuguese. The Portuguese successfully resisted the four months long siege. It is part of the Ottoman-Portuguese war.

Background
In 1509, the major Battle of Diu (1509) took place between the Portuguese and a joint fleet of the Sultan of Gujarat, the Mamluk Sultanate of Egypt, the Zamorin of Calicut with support of the Ottoman Empire. Since 1517, the Ottomans had attempted to combine forces with Gujarat in order to fight the Portuguese away from the Red Sea and in the area of India. Pro-Ottoman forces under Captain Hoca Sefer had been installed by Selman Reis in Diu.

Diu in Gujarat (now a state in western India), was with Surat, one of the main points of supply of spices to Ottoman Egypt at that time. However, Portuguese intervention thwarted that trade by controlling the traffic in the Red Sea. In 1530, the Venetians could not obtain any supply of spices through Egypt.

Under the command of Governor Nuno da Cunha, the Portuguese had attempted to capture Diu by force in February 1531, unsuccessfully. Thereafter, the Portuguese waged war on Gujarat, devastating its shores and several cities like Surat.

Soon after however, the Sultan of Gujarat, Bahadur Shah, who was under threat from the Mughal emperor Humayun, made an agreement with the Portuguese, granting them Diu in exchange for Portuguese assistance against the Mughals and protection should the realm fall. The Portuguese seized the stronghold of Gogala (Bender-i Türk) near the city, and built the Diu Fort. Once the threat from Humayun was removed, Bahadur tried to negotiate the withdrawal of the Portuguese, but on 13 February 1537 he died drowning during the negotiations on board of a Portuguese ship in unclear circumstances, both sides blaming the other for the tragedy.

Bahadur Shah had also appealed to the Ottomans to expel the Portuguese, which led to the 1538 expedition.

Ottoman fleet

Upon the arrival of Sultan Bahadur's envoy to Egypt with a large tribute in 1536, the Ottoman governor (pasha) of Egypt, 60-year-old eunuch Hadim Suleiman Pasha, was nominated by Sultan Suleiman the Magnificent to organize and personally lead an expedition to India. Pasha Suleiman forbade any shipping out of the Red Sea to avoid leaking information to the Portuguese in India. There were delays however due to the siege of Coron in the Mediterranean, and the Ottoman–Safavid war of 1533–1535.

According to the Tarikh al-Shihri, Ottoman forces amounted to 80 vessels and 40,000 men. Gaspar Correia provides a more specific account, claiming that the Turks assembled at Suez an armada composed of 15 "bastard galleys" (it), 40 "royal galleys", 6 galliots, 5 galleons "with four masts each" that were "dangerous ships to sail, for they were shallow with no keel"; five smaller craft, six foists from Gujarat, and two brigs. It carried over 400 artillery pieces in total, over 10,000 sailors and rowers (of which 1,500 were Christian) and 6,000 soldiers, of which 1,500 were janissaries. The Pasha employed a Venetian renegade, Francisco, as captain of 10 galleys, plus 800 Christian mercenaries. On July 20, 1538, the armada set sail from Jeddah, stopping by Kamaran Island before proceeding to Aden.

At Aden, Pasha Suleiman captured the city after inviting its ruler, Sheikh Amir bin Dawaud, favourable towards the Portuguese, aboard his ships, then hanging him. Thus, Aden was occupied without a siege, and plundered.

The expedition left Aden on August 19 and then called at Socotra, thereafter making its way to the western coast of Gujarat, despite losing some ships that got separated from the fleet during the passage of the Indian Ocean. It was the largest Ottoman fleet ever sent into the Indian Ocean.

The siege

The captain of Diu at the time was the experienced António da Silveira, former captain of Bassein and Hormuz who had participated in the Portuguese-Gujarati War of 1531–34. The Portuguese fortress housed about 3,000 people, of which solely 600 were soldiers.

First attacks
Under the command of Khadjar Safar – Coge Sofar in Portuguese, an Albanian renegade from Otranto and an influential lord in Gujarat – the Gujarati forces began crossing the channel of Diu onto the western side of the island on June 26, 1538, being held back by the city's western walls just long enough for the Portuguese to fill their water reserves and burn their supply storages in the city before finally retreating to the fortress on the eastern end of the island.

For the following two months the Gujaratis were unable to threaten the besieged with more than a low-intensity bombardment, while the Portuguese conducted occasional raids on the Gujarati positions.

Lopo de Sousa Coutinho, who would later write his memoirs on the siege, distinguished himself on August 14 after leading 14 Portuguese in a sortie into the city to capture supplies, defeating 400 soldiers of Khadjar Safar.

On September 4, the Ottoman fleet arrived in Diu, catching the Portuguese garrison by surprise and thus blockading the fortress by sea. Captain da Silveira immediately sent a small craft to run the blockade with a distress call to Goa, while Pasha Suleiman promptly landed 500 janissaries, who proceeded to plunder the city – causing Suleiman to fall out of favour with the lords of Gujarat but Khadjar Safar. The janissaries then attempted to scale the fortress' walls but were repelled with 50 dead. On September 7, a strong storm fell upon Diu, damaging part of the Ottoman fleet (and helping the Portuguese restore their water supplies), after which the Turks began unloading their artillery and a further 1,000 men, and raising a number of defensive and siege works around the fort. It seems by then the Gujarati lords became distrustful of the Ottomans, possibly fearing that they might establish themselves in Diu after expelling the Portuguese, and the following day refused to provide any further supplies.

On September 14, four foists from Goa and Chaul arrived with reinforcements.

A distant eyewitness, the famous Portuguese traveler Fernão Mendes Pinto later recounted how, passing by the fortress, Turkish galleys came close to seizing the tradeship he traveled in:

The Ottoman artillery opened fire on the fortress on the 28th, as their galleys bombarded it from the sea, with the Portuguese replying in suit – the Portuguese sank a galley but lost several men as two of their basilisks exploded.

Attack on the Village of the Rumes' Redoubt

Across the Diu channel on the mainland shore, the Portuguese kept a redoubt by a village dubbed Vila dos Rumes  – "Village of the Rumes" (Turks) modern day Gogolá – commanded by Captain Francisco Pacheco and defended by 30–40 Portuguese, which came under attack by Gujarati forces. On September 10 the army of Khadjar Safar bombarded the fortlet with Turkish artillery pieces before attempting to assault it with the aid of janissaries, but were repelled.

Khadjar Safar then ordered a craft be filled with timber, sulphur, and tar, which he hoped to place by the redoubt and smoke the Portuguese out. Realizing his intentions, António da Silveira sent Francisco de Gouveia with a small crew on a craft to burn the device with fire bombs under cover of night, despite coming under enemy fire. Another assault on September 28 with 700 janissaries failed after a prolonged bombardment.

The Portuguese garrison resisted until its captain Pacheco agreed to surrender to the Pasha on October 1, who had granted them safe passage to the fortress unharmed. When they surrendered however, Suleiman promptly had them imprisoned on his galleys.

The message of Francisco Pacheco and Captain António da Silveira's reply

Thus under the Pashas power, former captain Francisco Pacheco wrote a letter to captain António da Silveira, advising him to lay down arms; it was delivered by a Portuguese renegade António Faleyro, who had converted to Islam and dressed in the Turkish fashion, that he was at first unrecognizable by his former comrades. It read:

Captain António da Silveira, who considered the Pasha's conduct to have been treasonous (and Pachecos advice outrageous), replied in the following manner:

The writer Gaspar Correia provided a different account of the exchange, however it is not in accordance with that of the veteran Lopo de Sousa Coutinho, who personally participated in the siege.

Assault on the fortress

By October 5, the Turks had finished their siege works and assembled all their artillery, which included nine basilisks, five great bombards, fifteen heavy guns, and 80 medium and smaller cannon that bombarded the fortress for the following 27 days. That night, 5 more craft from Goa with gunpowder and reinforcements arrived. After seven days of bombardment, part of the bulwark of Gaspar de Sousa collapsed and the Turks attempted to scale it "with two banners", but were repelled with heavy losses to bombs and arquebus fire. Another assault the following morning was met with equally fierce resistance by the Portuguese. Afterwards, the Turks forced labourers into the moat to undermine the fortress' walls and, in spite of several losses, managed to open a breach with gunpowder, but already the Portuguese had raised a barricade around the breach from the inside, which caused many losses on the assailants once they attempted to break through. When at night the bombardment ceased, the Portuguese repaired the fortress' walls under the cover of darkness.

From an artillery battery on the opposite shore, the Turks bombarded the "Sea Fort" (Baluarte do Mar) that stood in the middle of the river mouth bombarding the flank of Muslim positions. On October 27, Suleiman Pasha ordered 6 small galleys to attempt to scale the fortlet, but came under heavy Portuguese cannon fire. The following day, the Turks drew 12 galleys and again attempted to "board" the fortlet, but were repelled with heavy losses due to fire bombs.

On October 30, Pasha Suleiman attempted a final diversion by faking the withdrawal of his forces, embarking 1,000 men. Ever cautious, António da Silveira ordered the sentries to be alert – at daybreak, 14,000 men divided in three "banners" attempted to scale the fortress as it was bombarded with no regard to friendly fire. A few hundred troops managed to scale the walls and raise banners but the Portuguese managed to repel the assailants, killing 500 and wounding a further 1,000 from gunfire and bombs out of the São Tomé bastion.

With his relation with Coja Safar and the Gujaratis degrading and increasingly fearful of being caught off-hand by the Viceroy's armada, on November 1 the Pasha finally decided to abandon the siege and began re-embarking his troops. Suspecting another ruse from the Pasha, Captain Silveira ordered 20 of his last men on a sortie to deceive the enemy of their dwindling forces. The party managed to capture a Turkish banner.

The Pasha however, intended on departing on November 5, but was unable due to unfavourable weather. That night, two small galleys reached Diu with reinforcements and supplies, firing their guns and signal rockets. The following morning, a fleet of 24 small galleys was sighted and believing it to be the vanguard of the governor's rescue fleet, the Pasha hurriedly departed, leaving 1,200 dead and 500 wounded behind. Khadjar Safar then set fire to his encampment and abandoned the island with his forces shortly after. In reality, it was just a forward fleet under the command of António da Silva Meneses and Dom Luís de Ataíde, dispatched from Goa with reinforcements, supplies, and news that the governor would depart soon to their aid. Although they took no part in the fighting, the small force was triumphantly received within the ruined fortress by its last survivors. The Portuguese were by then critically low on gunpowder and supplies and with less than 40 valid men; in the final stages of the siege, the Portuguese record that even the women assisted in its defence. Catarina Lopes and Isabel Madeira are examples of two female captains who actively participated during the siege, they led a squad of female soldiers.

Goa

The craft sent by António da Silveira arrived in Goa in mid September, but already governor Nuno da Cunha was well aware of the presence of the Turks in India: the Portuguese had intercepted a Turkish galleon in southern India and another galley that got separated from the fleet and called at Honavar, which the Portuguese destroyed with the aid of the locals (a fight in which Fernão Mendes Pinto participated). The governor had assembled a relief force of 14 galleons 8 galleys, several caravels and over 30 smaller oar ships, but in September 14 the new viceroy appointed by Lisbon arrived, and demanded the immediate succession in office.

By the end of 1537, reports on Ottoman preparations in Egypt had reached Lisbon through Venice, and King John III promptly ordered a reinforcement of 11 naus and 3,000 soldiers, of which 800 were fidalgos, to be dispatched to India as soon as possible along with the new viceroy, Dom Garcia de Noronha. At Goa however, Dom Garcia considered the relief force organized by governor Nuno da Cunha to be insufficient, though the Portuguese veterans in India argued otherwise. The viceroy remained in Goa for two more months, organizing his forces until he had gathered an imposing fleet, which according to João de Barros numbered 170 sail and 4500 Portuguese soldiers, and according to a detailed report by Francisco de Andrade, was composed of 152 vessels, which included 9 heavy carracks, 14 galleons, 13 small carracks, 8 war-caravels, 5 latin caravels, 1 bastard galley, 13 royal galleys, 15 galleots, 11 Mediterranean brigantines, 2 albetoças, 18 light galleys and 44 light vessels and oarcraft, bearing 5000 Portuguese soldiers, 3000 Indian auxiliaries, 1500 Portuguese sailors, uncounted number of native sailors, oarsmen and combat slaves and a little under 400 heavy cannon and 600 light cannon.  Just as the expedition was about to set sail to Diu however, a craft arrived in Goa with the information that the siege had been lifted.

Aftermath

The defeat of the combined Turkish and Gujarati forces at Diu represented a critical setback in Ottoman plans for expanding their influence into the Indian Ocean. Without a suitable base or allies, failure at Diu meant the Ottomans were unable to proceed with their campaign in India, leaving the Portuguese uncontested in the western Indian coast. Never again would the Ottoman Turks ever send so large an armada to India.

After the failed siege, the Ottomans returned to Aden, where they fortified the city with 100 pieces of artillery. One of them is still visible today at the Tower of London, following the capture of Aden by British forces in 1839. Suleiman Pasha also established Ottoman suzerainty over Shihr and Zabid, and reorganized the territories of Yemen and Aden as an Ottoman province, or Beylerbeylik.

The veteran Lopo de Sousa Coutinho later recounted that "it was said" that the Portuguese who had surrendered to Suleiman Pasha were all killed off in the Red Sea, on their way back to Egypt. Indeed, at As-Salif, by Kamaran Island, the Pasha had all prisoners under his control massacred, 140 in total, and their heads put on display in Cairo.

Suleiman Pasha left behind a number of very heavy cannon that could not be quickly moved, called "Sulaimani guns" by Persian authors. Several were salvaged by the governor of Junagadh Mujahid Khan Bahlim, and moved to that city. Many were broken up in the following centuries, but two survived in Junagadh, one of which stands in front of a mosque in Uparkot and bears an inscription which reads:

Suleiman Pasha intended to launch a second expedition against the Portuguese in Diu, but this did not happen. In 1540, the Portuguese sent a retaliatory expedition to Suez with a fleet of 72 ships, sacking Suakin, Kusayr, and spreading panic in Egypt. In 1546, the Ottoman established a new naval base in Basra, thus threatening the Portuguese in Hormuz. The Ottomans would suffer a strong naval defeat against the Portuguese in the Persian Gulf in 1554. Further conflict between the Ottomans and the Portuguese would lead to the Ottoman embassy to Aceh in 1565.

Portugal would remain in possession of the Diu enclave until Operation Vijay in 1961.

Gallery

See also
 Battle of Diu
 Siege of Diu (1531)
 Second siege of Diu
 Catarina Lopes
 Isabel Madeira

Notes

Former Portuguese colonies
Diu
Diu
Gujarat Sultanate
Diu
History of Daman and Diu
1538 in India
History of Kerala
Suleiman the Magnificent
Diu
1538 in the Ottoman Empire
16th century in Portuguese India